Endolasia transvaalica is a species of snout moth in the genus Endolasia. It was described by George Hampson in 1926. It is found in South Africa.

References

Endemic moths of South Africa
Moths described in 1926
Phycitinae